Hingorno is a small town situated in Taluka Sindhri, Mirpur Khas District, Sindh, Pakistan.  The town has a population of 35000.

Both Muslim and Hindu communities have been living in the town for centuries. The town is mostly dominated by the following tribes/castes: Halepoto, Junejo, Shar, Menghwar, Kunbhar, Lohar, Soomro, Syed, Panhwar, Brohi, Mahar, Khaskheli, Chandio(Mangrio), Rajar, Pahorhe, Kolhi, Bheel, Gujrati, Bhaat, Khatri and Lohana.

Occupations
A large portion of the population depends on agriculture. The main crops are cotton, wheat, mustard, onions, sugarcane, vegetables and fruit. Ten percent of the population holds other occupations, including private and government jobs.

Facilities
A government hospital is available for first aid services. Several mosques, including the historical Motia Masjid, are available for the Muslim communities.

See also 
List of tehsils of Sindh

References 

Mirpur Khas District